The Tito Puente Amphitheatre (or Anfiteatro Tito Puente in Spanish) is a concert amphitheater in San Juan, Puerto Rico. It is named after the late mambo musician and percussionist Tito Puente. It was previously named "Luis Muñoz Marín Amphitheatre" (or Anfiteatro Luis Muñoz Marín")

The amphitheatre is a frequent spot for concerts of all kinds of music. It hosts the Puerto Rico Heineken Jazz Festival each year. It is located in San Juan, Puerto Rico adjacent to the Roberto Clemente Coliseum and the Hiram Bithorn Stadium.

In December 2021, Latin Jazz musician, Eddie Palmieri performed at the amphitheatre and in June 2022, Bad Bunny and Buscabulla performed in concert there.

See also
 List of contemporary amphitheatres

References

Buildings and structures in San Juan, Puerto Rico
Theatres in Puerto Rico
Tourist attractions in San Juan, Puerto Rico